A Scanian derby is the name given to any fixture between football clubs in Scania, the southernmost county and traditional province of Sweden. The most high-profile fixture in the region is the rivalry between Helsingborgs IF and Malmö FF. Historically, the rivalry between the two clubs and Landskrona BoIS is also well known. Additional Scanian football clubs that are playing in the upper three tiers of Swedish football are BK Olympic, IFK Malmö, Trelleborgs FF, Lunds BK, Torns IF and Ängelholms FF. Two cities have more than one club in the top three tiers: Malmö with MFF, BK Olympic and IFK Malmö, and Lund with Lunds BK and Torns IF.

Teams in Scania
As of the 2022 season, eight clubs in the upper three tiers of Swedish football are based in the Scania area, as follows:

Additionally, Ariana FC, FBK Balkan, Eskilsminne IF, Eslövs BK, Hittarps IK, IFK Hässleholm, Hässleholms IF, Höganäs BK, Kristianstad FC, Nosaby IF, FC Rosengård and Österlen FF participates in the fourth tier.

Number of Allsvenskan seasons
Seven clubs from Scania have played in the highest Swedish league. Three clubs from the city of Helsingborg (Helsingborgs IF, Råå IF and Stattena IF), two clubs from Malmö (Malmö FF and IFK Malmö), and one club each from Landskrona (Landskrona BoIS) and Trelleborg (Trelleborgs FF).

Attendances in the 21st century
Top 10 attendances for Scanian derbies during the 21st century:

* Attendances are provided in the Publikliga sections of the Svenska Fotbollförbundet website.

References

External links
 Sveriges Fotbollshistoriker och Statistiker – Statistics for all Allsvenskan and Svenska Cupen matches
 Helsingborgs IF official website
 Malmö FF official website
 Landskrona BoIS official website
 Trelleborgs FF official website

 Kristianstad FC official website
 Lunds BK official website
 Eskilsminne IF official website
 Torns IF official website

Helsingborgs IF
Malmö FF
Landskrona BoIS
Trelleborgs FF

Kristianstad FC
Lunds BK
Football derbies in Sweden